Orthotylus tenellus is a subspecies of bug from a family of Miridae that is endemic to Bulgaria.

References

tenellus meridionalis
Endemic fauna of Bulgaria
Hemiptera of Europe
Insects described in 2006